Christopher Louis Harms (born 21 April 1956) is a former cricketer who played first-class cricket for South Australia from 1982/83 to 1985/86.

Harms was a lower-order batsman and off-spin bowler. His highest first-class score was 46 not out, when he helped South Australia avoid defeat against the English tourists in 1982-83. His best bowling figures came against Tasmania in 1985-86, when he played an important role in a 55-run victory: 43 not out and 5 not out, and 3 for 49 and 4 for 60.

He leads the not-for-profit All Australian Company, a sport-based manufacturing business employing predominantly indigenous people in Adelaide's north. He has served as a councillor on the Barossa Council in South Australia.

References

External links

1956 births
Living people
Australian cricketers
South Australia cricketers
Sportspeople from Albury
Cricketers from New South Wales